Dada (also known as Dada the Appa) is a 2023 Indian Tamil-language coming-of-age romantic drama film written and directed by Ganesh K. Babu in his directorial debut. The film stars Kavin, Aparna Das and K. Bhagyaraj. The film focuses on the life of a young man who later adores the role of fatherhood and as a single parent. The film sends out a stronger message indicating that parenthood is gender neutral. 
 
Dada was released by theatrically on 10 February 2023 and received highly positive reviews from critics and audience, and was a commercially success at the box-office.

Synopsis 
Manikandan and Sindhu are final-year college students, and is in a relationship. However, Sindhu gets pregnant and their life changes. Circumstances compel the couple to get separated from each other, mainly owing to Manikandan's ill-fated behavior during Sindhu's pregnancy. Manikandan is being given the sole responsibility of raising the child. He faces several challenges and barriers in adoring his fatherhood.

Cast

Production 
The film project was announced by debutant filmmaker Ganesh K. Babu. The film project marked first film for Aparna Das as lead actress in Tamil after previously making her debut in a small role in Nelson Dilipkumar's directorial venture Beast (2022). 

The principal photography of the film began in March 2022 and the film was predominantly shot and set in Chennai. The shooting of the film was wrapped up in September 2022.

Release

Theatrical 
The film was released in over 400 theatres across Tamil Nadu. The Tamil theatrical release for the film was acquired by Red Giant Movies.Overseas rights bagged by Ayngaran International

Home media  
The digital streaming rights of the film has been bagged by Amazon Prime Video. The film is scheduled to have its digital premiere on the streaming platform from 10 March 2023.

Critic Reception 
Logesh Balachandran critic from Times of india gave 3.5 stars out of 5 and stated that " Director Ganesh K. Babu's writing is effective enough to pull the audience into the world of Manikandan, a single parent, who gets into that redemption phase. "appreciated film.Navein Darshan critic from Cinema Express wrote that "The film is emotional but is equally fun with a strong undercurrent of tasteful humour" and gave 3.5 rating out 5 .Janani K from India Today critic gave 3 out of 5 stars and appreciated film.Haricharan Pudipeddi Critic from Hindustan Times noted that "The most refreshing aspect of DaDa is that it sends out a very important message loud and clear – parenthood is gender neutral".The Hindu critic gave mixture of review and wrote that " The writing, on the other hand, only solidifies. There are some really enjoyable, heart-melting touches in the second act"

References

External links 

2020s coming-of-age drama films
2023 directorial debut films
2023 drama films
2023 comedy films
2023 romantic comedy films
2023 romance films
2020s Tamil-language films